Dmitriý Mihaýlowiç Korj  (born 29 October 1971) is a retired Turkmenistani footballer, and assistant coach of the Altyn Asyr FK . He also holds Ukrainian citizenship.

Club career
He started playing in Köpetdag Aşgabat, in seasons from 1989 to 1992 in the Soviet Second League. From 1992 to 1995, he played in the Turkmenistan Ýokary Liga.

For the 1996 season in Russia, he played for the first league of FC Uralan and FC Lokomotiv Chita.

He returned to Turkmenistan, playing for Nisa Aşgabat, again becoming the champion of Turkmenistan. In autumn 1999 he played in the Ukraine for FC Elektron Romny and FC Naftovyk-Ukrnafta. Starting in 2000 he played again in Turkmenistan for FC Nisa and FC Köpetdag.

International career
He played for the Turkmenistan national football team and was a member of the final tournament of the 1994 Asian Games.

Coaching career
He has been head coach of FC Bagtyyarlyk at 2009. Since 2015, he works as a coach for Altyn Asyr FK, in international games, as head coach.

References

External links
 
 
 

1971 births
Living people
Soviet footballers
Turkmenistan footballers
Turkmenistan expatriate footballers
Turkmenistan international footballers
Expatriate footballers in Russia
Turkmenistan expatriate sportspeople in Russia
FC Naftovyk-Ukrnafta Okhtyrka players
FK Köpetdag Aşgabat players
FC Nisa Aşgabat players
FC Elista players
Association football defenders
Footballers at the 1994 Asian Games
Asian Games competitors for Turkmenistan
Turkmenistan football managers
FC Chita players